Sven Emil Strömberg (22 January 1911 – 22 October 1986) was a Swedish sprinter who won a bronze medal in the 4 × 400 m relay at the 1934 European Championships. He competed in the 400 m and 4 × 400 m events at the 1936 Summer Olympics and finished fifth in the relay.

References

Athletes (track and field) at the 1936 Summer Olympics
Olympic athletes of Sweden
Swedish male sprinters
1911 births
1986 deaths
European Athletics Championships medalists
People from Karlskrona
Sportspeople from Blekinge County